4-DAMP (1,1-dimethyl-4-diphenylacetoxypiperidinium iodide) is a selective muscarinic acetylcholine receptor (mAChR) M3 antagonist. It is also able to antagonize M1 receptors but "prefers" M3. It competitively binds to the acetylcholine binding site on mAChRs, causing right-ward shift in the dose response curves for mAChR agonists.

References

Muscarinic antagonists
Iodides
Carboxylate esters
Piperidines
Quaternary ammonium compounds